The official German hip hop album chart is a record charts compiled by GfK Entertainment GmbH on behalf of Bundesverband Musikindustrie (Federal Association of Phonographic Industry). The chart week runs from Friday to Thursday with the official chart being published on the following Monday. The charts are based on sales of physical albums from retail outlets as well as permanent music downloads and streaming.

In 2017, forty-six albums reached the top of the chart. The first number one of the year was Palmen aus Plastik by German rapper Bonez MC and Austrian rapper RAF Camora and was replaced in the following week by A Tribe Called Quest's last studio album We Got It from Here... Thank You 4 Your Service. The first album to top the chart for more than a week was Sampler 4 by 187 Strassenbande. The sampler album topped the chart for four consecutive weeks during the summer. Royal Bunker by Sido and Kool Savas, Jung Brutal Gutaussehend 3 by Kollegah and Farid Bang and Revival, by Eminem were the only other albums to top the chart for longer than a week. The chart was dominated by German artists, with only four English language albums reaching the top, including A Tribe Called Quest's We Got It from Here... Thank You 4 Your Service, More Life by Drake, Kendrick Lamar's Damn and Eminem's Revival, for a total of five weeks. Revival was the final album to reach the top in 2017.

Chart history

References

Germany hip hop
Hip hop albums 2017